Erigeron foliosus, known by the common names leafy daisy and leafy fleabane, is a North American species of flowering plants in the family Asteraceae.

Erigeron foliosus is native to western North America from Oregon, through California, into Baja California.  It can be found in many habitats, including chaparral, oak woodlands, and rocky talus.

Description

Unlike some other fleabanes, it has leaves evenly spaced all over the stem.

The head has a center of golden yellow disc florets surrounded by a fringe of up to 60 pale to medium purple ray florets.

Varieties
The recognized varieties of Erigeron foliosus include:
 Erigeron foliosus var. confinis (Howell) Jeps. — endemic to Klamath Mountains in northwestern California + southwestern Oregon
 Erigeron foliosus var. foliosus  — California (from Amador + San Mateo Counties south to San Diego County), Baja California
 Erigeron foliosus var. franciscensis G.L.Nesom — endemic to San Francisco Bay Area
 Erigeron foliosus var. hartwegii (Greene) Jeps. — California, Oregon
 Erigeron foliosus var. mendocinus (Greene) G.L.Nesom 	— Mendocino erigeron, Mendocino fleabane; Mendocino and Del Norte County, California

References

External links
Jepson Manual Treatment of Erigeron foliosus
United States Department of Agriculture Plants Profile: Erigeron foliosus 
Erigeron foliosus — Calphotos Photo gallery, University of California

foliosus
Flora of California
Flora of Oregon
Natural history of the California Coast Ranges
Natural history of the Mojave Desert
Natural history of the Peninsular Ranges
Plants described in 1840
Natural history of the Santa Monica Mountains
Flora without expected TNC conservation status